Katarína Šarišská (born 28 September 1965) is a Czech gymnast. She competed in six events at the 1980 Summer Olympics.

References

External links
 

1965 births
Living people
Czech female artistic gymnasts
Olympic gymnasts of Czechoslovakia
Gymnasts at the 1980 Summer Olympics
People from Znojmo
Sportspeople from the South Moravian Region